Sher Bahadur Deuba  (born 13 June 1946) is a Nepali politician and former prime minister of Nepal. He has also been serving as the president of the Nepali Congress since 2016. Deuba has served five terms as the prime minister (1995–1997, 2001–2002, 2004–2005, 2017–2018 and 2021-2022) and is the Member of Parliament for the parliamentary constituency of Dadeldhura 1.

Born and raised in Ashigram, a remote village in Dadeldhura, Deuba completed his primary education there and secondary education in Doti. He completed his higher education from Tri-Chandra College In 1991, he was elected to the House of Representatives and served as the Minister of Home Affairs in the cabinet led by Girija Prasad Koirala. Deuba became prime minister after Manmohan Adhikari tried to dissolve the parliament for a second time in two years in 1995. He oversaw the signature of the Mahakali treaty with India during his first term. His second premiership started in July 2001 amidst the rise of the Maoists and he later declared a state of emergency and listed the Communist Party of Nepal (Maoist) as a "terrorist organisation". He was dismissed by King Gyanendra in October 2002, but after public backlash, he was reappointed prime minister in June 2004. He was arrested after 2005 coup d'état by the King Gyanendra, and was released in February 2006 after the Supreme Court declared his arrest unlawful.

Deuba was sworn in as prime minister for a fourth stint in June 2017, as per an agreement to form a rotational government by Congress and CPN (Maoist Centre). His government successfully conducted the elections of all three levels of government in different phases in 2017. On 12 July 2021, the Supreme Court ordered the appointment of Deuba as prime minister within 28 hours, and he was appointed prime minister for a fifth term by President Bidya Devi Bhandari in accordance with Article 76(5) of the Constitution of Nepal the next day.

Deuba is married to Arzu Rana Deuba. They have one son.

Early life 
Deuba was born on 13 June 1946 in Ashigram, a remote village in Dadeldhura district of far-western Nepal (present-day Ganyapdhura Rural Municipality, Sudurpashchim Province). He received his primary education from Asigram Primary School and secondary education from Mahendra Higher Sec. School and Sitaram Higher Secondary School in Doti. After completing SLC, Deuba was enrolled in the Tri-Chandra College for higher education.
He registered at the London School of Economics (LSE) in 1989, under the "research fee" category which allowed him "to use the LSE library, and have a professor assigned for general guidance, but not take classes". His professor was Fred Halliday and he was assigned to complete some work on parliamentary democracies. Deuba, however, never published any work at the LSE. Deuba was in London when the 1990 revolution broke out where he campaigned for the revolution. The Socialist International had cancelled his stipend; subsequently, he had to depend on a loan given by Nepalis, worked for the BBC Nepali irregularly, and temporarily lived at a restaurant. He left the school in 1990.

Political career

Early career and first premiership 
He began his political career as a student and alongside others founded the Nepal Student Union, a student wing of the Nepali Congress. From 1971 to 1980, he served as president of the student wing. During the 1960s and 1970s, Deuba was jailed intermittently for nine years for working against the Panchayat system.

Deuba was an active campaigner during the 1990 revolution which dissolved the partyless Panchayat system and ushered in the beginning of multiparty democracy. In the next year's general elections, he was elected to the House of Representatives from Dadeldhura 1. He served as the Minister of Home Affairs in the cabinet of Girija Prasad Koirala. After Koirala dissolved the parliament and his government was defeated in the 1994 mid-term elections, Deuba was elected parliamentary party leader of the Nepali Congress. After Manmohan Adhikari tried to dissolve the parliament again in 1995 which was declared unconstitutional by the Supreme Court, Deuba was appointed Prime Minister in 1995 and led a coalition government with the Rastriya Prajatantra Party.

On 12 February 1996, he signed the Mahakali treaty with the Government of India regarding the development of the watershed of the Mahakali River. His administration, which witnessed the beginning of the Maoist insurgency, fell in March 1997 and he was succeeded by Lokendra Bahadur Chand who led a minority coalition government.

Second premiership 
Following the resignation of Girija Prasad Koirala as prime minister, Deuba defeated Sushil Koirala to become the parliamentary party leader of the Nepali Congress and was appointed Prime Minister for a second time on 26 July 2001. He became prime minister shortly after the royal massacre and during the heights of the Maoist insurgency, and he soon announced a ceasefire with the Communist Party of Nepal (Maoist). In August 2001, he began peace talks with the Maoists, but after the Maoists pulled out of talks and attacked the army in November 2001, Deuba declared a state of emergency, and the Communist Party of Nepal (Maoist) was listed as a "terrorist organisation".

In early 2002, Deuba requested a dissolution of the parliament in order to hold fresh elections. The same year, he founded the breakaway party, Nepali Congress (Democratic). In October 2002, King Gyanendra took over the democratically elected Government led by Sher Bahadur Deuba.

Third premiership 

After two other governments in two years, Deuba was reappointed as prime minister by King Gyanendra on 4 June 2004. A year later, following the 2005 Nepal coup d'état led by the king, who suspended the constitution and assumed direct authority, Deuba and his cabinet members were put under house arrest, and "key constitutional rights were suspended, soldiers enforced complete censorship, and communications were cut". In July 2005, he was sentenced to two years in prison by former King Gyanendra but was subsequently released on 13 February 2006 after the prison sentence  was outlawed by the Supreme Court of Nepal. In September 2007, Deuba dissolved his splinter party and rejoined the Nepali Congress.

2008 Constituent Assembly election 
In the Constituent Assembly election held on 10 April 2008, Deuba was nominated by the Nepali Congress as its candidate for both Dadeldhura 1 and Kanchanpur 4 constituencies. He won from both the constituencies and gave up his Kanchanpur 4 seat, where he was replaced by Harish Thakulla of the Unified Communist Party of Nepal (Maoist), who he defeated in the general election, after a by-election.

In the subsequent vote for prime minister held in the Constituent Assembly on 15 August 2008, Deuba was nominated as the Nepali Congress candidate but was defeated by Pushpa Kamal Dahal of the UCPN (Maoist). Deuba received 113 votes, while Dahal received 464.

In 2009, after the fall of the Dahal-led government and the ailing health of party president Girija Prasad Koirala, Deuba put up his candidacy to become the parliamentary party leader of the Nepali Congress in a bid to become the prime minister again but was defeated by Ram Chandra Poudel.

First Term as party president 
Deuba, a veteran leader of Nepali Congress was chosen party president for the first time from the 13th general convention of the party beating Ram Chandra Paudel. He ran alongside Senior Congress Leader Arjun Narasingha KC as his General Secretary and Sita Devi Yadav as his Treasurer.

He eventually assigned Bimalendra Nidhi as party Vice-president, Purna Bahadur Khadka as general secretary and Prakash Sharan Mahat deputy general secretary.

Fourth premiership 

After the death of Sushil Koirala, in 2016, Deuba was elected president of the Nepali Congress at the party's thirteenth general convention defeating his intra-party rival, Ram Chandra Poudel, receiving almost 60% of the votes cast.

In August 2016, Deuba struck a deal with Pushpa Kamal Dahal to lead a rotational government led by the CPN (Maoist Centre) and the Nepali Congress for nine months each in the lead to the general elections in late 2017. Per the agreement, he was sworn in as Prime Minister for a fourth stint on 7 June 2017. On 17 October 2017, all ministers from the CPN (Maoist Centre) left the cabinet after they formed an electoral alliance with the CPN (UML) in preparation for the general election and rescinded support to the Deuba government.

Deuba was in charge of the government that successfully conducted elections of all three levels (parliamentary, provincial, and local) in different phases in 2017. He resigned on 15 February 2018, paving way for KP Sharma Oli, leader of the Communist Party of Nepal (UML), the largest party in the 2017 polls, to become prime minister.

Fifth premiership 

On 21 May 2021, after prime minister KP Sharma Oli failed to obtain a vote of confidence in the House of Representatives, the opposition alliance – comprising the Nepali Congress, Communist Party of Nepal (Maoist Centre), the Madhav Kumar Nepal faction of the CPN (UML) and Upendra Yadav faction of the People's Socialist Party, Nepal – asked the president to appoint Deuba prime minister, per Article 76 (5) of the Constitution of Nepal, presenting signatures of majority members of the House of Representatives to stake claim to a new government. The president denied this claim, stating neither Deuba nor Oli could be appointed prime minister after Oli also demanded to be reappointed. The president also dissolved the lower house for the second time in five months and called for fresh elections later in November.

On 12 July 2021, the constitutional bench of the Supreme Court, formed to hear writs against the dissolution of the House of Representatives filed by the opposition alliance, ruled that president Bidya Devi Bhandari's decision to dissolve the House of Representatives on the recommendation of prime minister Oli was unlawful and ordered the appointment of Deuba as prime minister within 28 hours, legitimising his earlier claim.

President Bhandari appointed Deuba as the prime minister in accordance with Article 76 (5) of the Constitution of Nepal, and he was sworn in for a fifth term on 13 July 2021. Required to win a vote of confidence in the House of Representatives within thirty days of his appointment per Article 76 (6) of the constitution, Deuba did so on 18 July 2021, receiving 165 votes in his favour and 83 against in the 275-member house. This guaranteed his government to remain in office for at least a year and a half, until the next general elections will be held in late 2022.

Second term as party president 

Deuba was elected second time as party president of Nepali Congress. Deuba was unable to win in the first round after none was able to secure 51% votes as per the Constitution of the party. The condition went against him when his close confidant and party vice president Bimalendra Nidhi filed candidacy for the post.In the second round he was elected president for the second time after receiving support from Prakash Man Singh and Bimalendra Nidhi. Garnering nearly 60% votes, Deuba was elected party president for the second time.

Personal life 
Deuba is married to Arzu Rana Deuba and has a son Jaiveer Singh. In November 2016, Deuba was conferred an honorary doctorate degree by Jawaharlal Nehru University in India.

Electoral history 

He has been elected to the Pratinidhi Sabha from Dadeldhura 1 in 1991, 1994, 1999, and 2017 on a Nepali Congress ticket. He won from Dadeldhura 1 in both the 2008 and 2013 Constituent Assembly elections. He contested and won from two constituencies in the 2008 CA election and gave up his Kanchanpur 4 seat. Only the top two candidates are shown below.

References

External links 

|-

|-

|-

|-

|-

|-

1946 births
20th-century prime ministers of Nepal
21st-century prime ministers of Nepal
Alumni of the London School of Economics
Heads of government who were later imprisoned
Living people
Nepal MPs 1991–1994
Nepal MPs 1994–1999
Nepal MPs 1999–2002
Nepal MPs 2017–2022
Nepalese Hindus
Nepali Congress (Democratic) politicians
Nepali Congress politicians from Sudurpashchim Province
People from Dadeldhura District
People of the Nepalese Civil War
Prime ministers of Nepal
Nepalese political party founders
Tri-Chandra College alumni
Members of the 1st Nepalese Constituent Assembly
Members of the 2nd Nepalese Constituent Assembly
Nepal MPs 2022–present